Tom Ewell (born Samuel Yewell Tompkins, April 29, 1909 – September 12, 1994) was an American film, stage and television actor, and producer. His most successful and most identifiable role was that of Richard Sherman in The Seven Year Itch, a character he played in the Broadway production (1952–1954) and reprised for the 1955 film adaptation. He received a Tony Award for his work in the play and a Golden Globe Award for his performance in the film. Although Ewell preferred acting on stage, he accepted several other screen roles in light comedies of the 1950s, most notably The Girl Can't Help It (1956). He appeared in the film version of the musical State Fair (1962) and in a small number of additional ones released between the early 1960s and 1980s.

Early life
Ewell was born in Owensboro, Kentucky, the son of Martine (née Yewell) and Samuel William Tompkins. His family expected him to follow in their footsteps as lawyers or whiskey and tobacco dealers, but Ewell decided to pursue acting instead. He began acting in summer stock in 1928 with Don Ameche before moving to New York City in 1931. He enrolled in the Actors Studio.

Career
He made his Broadway debut in 1934 and his film debut in 1940, and for several years, he played comic supporting roles. His acting career was interrupted during World War II when he served in the United States Navy.

After World War II, Ewell attracted attention with a strong performance in the film Adam's Rib (1949), and he began to receive Hollywood roles more frequently. Ewell continued acting in summer stock through the 1940s: He starred opposite June Lockhart in Lawrence Riley's biographical play Kin Hubbard in 1951, the story of one of America's greatest humorists and cartoonists, Kin Hubbard. With this play, he made his debut as a producer. In 1947, he won a Clarence Derwent Award for his portrayal of Fred Taylor in the original Broadway cast of John Loves Mary.

His most successful and, arguably, most identifiable role came in 1952, when he joined the Broadway production of The Seven Year Itch as protagonist Richard Sherman. With Vanessa Brown as "The Girl", Ewell played the part more than 950 times over three years, as he indicated in a mystery guest appearance on the June 12, 1955, airing of What's My Line? to promote the 1955 film adaptation. He earned both the Tony Award for Best Actor in a Play and the Golden Globe Award for Best Actor – Motion Picture Musical or Comedy for portraying Sherman.

He enjoyed other film successes, including The Lieutenant Wore Skirts with Sheree North and The Girl Can't Help It (both 1956) opposite Jayne Mansfield. In The Girl Can't Help It, Julie London appears as a mirage to Tom Miller (Ewell) singing her signature song, "Cry Me a River". He played Abel Frake in the 1962 version of the Rodgers and Hammerstein musical State Fair. In 1956, at the Coconut Grove Playhouse, he co-starred with Bert Lahr in the U.S. premiere of Waiting for Godot.

However, as his film and theater careers seemed to have reached their peaks, he turned his attention to television. Over several years, he played guest roles in numerous series, and received an Emmy Award nomination for his continuing role in Baretta. His final acting performance was in a 1986 episode of Murder, She Wrote.

From September 1960 to May 1961, Ewell starred in his own television series, in the self-titled The Tom Ewell Show, which lasted for one season.

In 1970, Ewell played Hoy Valentine in The Men From Shiloh (the rebranded name of The Virginian) in the episode titled "With Love, Bullets and Valentines". In the mid-1970s, Ewell enjoyed popular success with a recurring role as retired veteran policeman Billy Truman in the 1970s Emmy-winning TV series Baretta. Ewell appeared in 36 episodes of the television-cop series, which starred Robert Blake as Detective Tony Baretta, until its end in 1978. In 1979, he was a guest star on the television series Taxi. Ewell also co-starred from 1981 to 1982 as the drunken town doctor in the short-lived television series Best of the West.

Personal life and death

On March 18, 1946, he married Judy Abbott, daughter of Broadway director George Abbott; the short-lived marriage ended in divorce a year later. Ewell then married Marjorie Sanborn on May 5, 1948; they had a son, Taylor.

Ewell died of undisclosed causes at the Motion Picture Country House and Hospital on September 12, 1994. His widow, Marjorie, said he had suffered a long series of illnesses. Ewell was also survived by his adopted son, Taylor (November 2, 1954), and by his mother, Martine Yewell Tompkins (1889–1998), who lived in Curdsville, Kentucky, where she died at age 109.

Legacy
In 2003, Ewell was inducted into the Owensboro High School Hall of Fame.

Filmography

Film

Television

Theatre

Accolades

References

External links

1909 births
1994 deaths
20th-century American male actors
American male film actors
American male stage actors
American male television actors
United States Navy personnel of World War II
Best Musical or Comedy Actor Golden Globe (film) winners
Clarence Derwent Award winners
Donaldson Award winners
People from Owensboro, Kentucky
Tony Award winners
United States Navy sailors
Male actors from Kentucky